El Nuevo Siglo is a regional daily newspaper based in Bogotá, Colombia.

History and profile
It was founded in 1925 with the name El Siglo by Laureano Gómez Castro and José de la Vega, but its staunch opposition to the military rule of General Gustavo Rojas Pinilla led it to be closed by the Government in 1953, and only reopened at the end of the dictatorship in 1957. The newspaper had a drastic change of presentation in 1990, when it went from a broadsheet format to tabloid, and changed its name to the current one.

References

Publications established in 1925
Newspapers published in Colombia
Spanish-language newspapers
Mass media in Bogotá
1925 establishments in Colombia